A train derailment occurred on February 3, 2023, at 8:55 p.m. EST (UTC−5), when 38 cars of a Norfolk Southern freight train carrying hazardous materials derailed in East Palestine, Ohio, United States. Several railcars burned for more than two days, with emergency crews then conducting a controlled burn of several railcars which released hydrogen chloride and phosgene into the air. As a result, residents within a  radius were evacuated, and an emergency response was initiated from agencies in Ohio, Pennsylvania, and West Virginia.

Background 
The derailed train was Norfolk Southern train 32N operating from the Terminal Railroad Association of St. Louis yard in Madison, Illinois, to Norfolk Southern's Conway Yard in Conway, Pennsylvania, on the Fort Wayne Line. Aboard the  train were an engineer, conductor, and conductor trainee. The train consisted of 141 loaded cars and 9 empty cars. Other reports note one more car, for a total of 151 cars, weighing 18,000 tons.

Of those cars, 20 were carrying hazardous materials, including chloroethene (vinyl chloride), butyl acrylate, 2-ethylhexyl acrylate, ethylene glycol monobutyl ether, isobutylene, combustible liquids, and benzene residue. The train departed Madison on February 1, and had suffered at least one mechanical failure before the derailment.

Derailment

Security footage from a business in Salem, Ohio ( northwest from East Palestine), and a Ring doorbell camera from New Waterford, Ohio ( northwest from East Palestine), show fire emanating from underneath a rail car. After this, at around 8:55 pm EST on February 3, 2023, 51 cars derailed on the east side of town, near the border with Pennsylvania. 49 of the cars ended up in a derailment pile, which caught fire and burned for several days. Of the 51 derailed cars, 11 of them were tank cars which dumped 100,000 gallons of hazardous materials, including vinyl chloride, benzene residue, and butyl acrylate.

About 48 hours later, the NTSB released preliminary findings indicating that the derailment was caused by a mechanical problem on one of the railcars' trucks, which may be connected to reports that an axle was observed throwing sparks about an hour before. The crew received an alarm from a wayside defect detector shortly before the derailment indicating a mechanical problem, and then an emergency brake application initiated.

Emergency response and burn off

Nearly 70 emergency agencies from Ohio, West Virginia, and Pennsylvania mobilized in response. East Palestine Mayor Trent Conaway declared a state of emergency.

Norfolk Southern personnel were first to respond on February 3. On February 4, they noticed water spillage into Sulphur Run and Leslie Run, and installed booms and underflow dams to separate the floating pollutant. The U.S. Environmental Protection Agency (EPA) began monitoring air quality on February 3. According to the EPA, humans can smell butyl acrylate at a concentration lower than the screening level (exposure limit). The National Institute for Occupational Safety and Health (NIOSH) recommended exposure limit for butyl acrylate is time-weighted average 10 ppm (55 mg/m3).

On February 5, a temperature change in one of the train cars caused fears of an explosion with the potential to disperse shrapnel as the fires continued to burn. Although five cars containing vinyl chloride remained intact following the crash, the relief valve on one of the cars had malfunctioned. Ohio Governor Mike DeWine activated the Ohio National Guard to assist local authorities in what he called "a matter of life and death". Pennsylvania Governor Josh Shapiro ordered an evacuation in areas of Beaver County which bordered the site. Officials in both states went door-to-door to evacuate residents. The fire from the accident burned until February 5. 

On February 6, DeWine and Shapiro ordered the mandatory evacuation of all residents within a  area. In an effort to prevent further explosions, Norfolk Southern emergency crews conducted a controlled release and burn of the five tanks of vinyl chloride into the air. Small shaped charges were used to breach the tank cars, and the vinyl chloride was allowed to flow into a trench, where it was ignited by flares. The burn caused black clouds to form above the area, and released phosgene and hydrogen chloride into the air. Although officials reported that air quality readings were not showing anything concerning, residents in nearby Mahoning and Trumbull counties reported a chemical smell in their areas. Officials in the Youngstown region advised residents to stay indoors. Air monitoring conducted on February 7–8 revealed an increase in volatile organic compounds (VOCs) in the air below the screening level and an increase in particulate matter, probably from the soot.

On February 8, state and federal EPA workers noticed oily spillage on the soil and notified Norfolk Southern, which began removing it with a vacuum truck.

On the evening of February 8, Norfolk Southern resumed traffic through the town. East Palestine Mayor Trent Conaway said that he was displeased because the railroad had said that trains would not run again until all residents were able to return to their homes. On the morning of February 10, Amtrak Capitol Limited trains resumed passing through East Palestine.

The evacuation was lifted on February 9 after the EPA reported that the air inside and outside the evacuation zone had returned to normal levels. Although toxicants were detected at the derailment site, they were not detected outside the area. The Ohio EPA also reported that drinking water (sourced from different waterways) was safe. In a testing report from February 8, the Ohio EPA showed WKBN-TV that vinyl chloride, benzene, some chlorinated organic compounds, and other VOCs were not detected in the water.

On February 16 the Environmental Protection Agency administrator Michael S. Regan visited the scene to provide assistance.

Health and environmental concerns

The Ohio Department of Natural Resources stated the chemical spill killed an estimated 3,500 small fish across  of streams as of February 8. A later estimate put the number of minnows at 38,222, with other species of animals at 5,500, totaling 43,222. Several captive foxes at Parker Dairy became sick over the following weekend, and one died, which its owner attributed to the derailment. Material from the crash was observed in storm drains and detected in samples from Sulphur Run, Leslie Run, Bull Creek, North Fork Little Beaver Creek, Little Beaver Creek, and the Ohio River. An oily product was seen seeping into the soil. Emergency response staff are assessing potential impacts on aquatic life. On February 23, Mary Mertz, director of the Ohio Department of Natural Resources, stated that the derailment potentially killed more than 43,000 fish, crustaceans, amphibians and other marine animals. State officials said on February 23 that they have not yet seen deaths or other negative effects on animals living on the land. However, residents report that pets and animals as far as 10 miles from the derailment site died overnight during the controlled release of vinyl chloride.

Neil Donahue, a chemistry professor at Carnegie Mellon University (CMU), expressed concern about the potential production of dioxins during the burning of vinyl chloride, while Lynn Goldman, dean of the Milken Institute School of Public Health, worried more about residual vinyl chloride. Gaseous pollutants dissipate quickly in the air, but dioxins are persistent.

The Bristol Panthers girls' basketball team forfeited their Ohio High School Athletic Association tournament road game against the East Palestine Bulldogs, citing safety concerns.

William M. Diesslin, board chair of the Institute of Hazardous Materials Management, suggested that burning vinyl chloride was "the lesser of two evils", from reading from the emergency response guide and from safety data sheets.

The Guardian reported, quoting a police officer who presents at the incident: "We were never told about the cargo on the train and we were never told to wear protective clothing, although it did not matter because our Personal protective equipment (PPE) dates back to 2010". Ohio citizens fear health hazards near train sites while no one is being held answerable.

Waste disposal
Officials in Michigan expressed disappointment that contaminated soil had been disposed of in southeast Michigan without their knowledge, while officials in Texas likewise acknowledged that they were only officially informed of waste water disposal from the derailment in Texas via an announcement on Ohio Governor Mike DeWine's website.

On February 26, a protest against the imported waste shipments was held in Romulus, Michigan, near one of the two EPA-approved waste disposal sites within the state of Michigan.

Independent testing
Researchers from multiple universities entered the impact area to conduct environmental sampling in February 2023. Results of the Texas A&M and CMU investigation indicated chemical levels in air above long-term exposure limits. In particular 1,1,2-trichloroethane, 1,3-Butadiene, acrolein, benzene, m-,p-,o-xylenes, naphthalene, trichloroethylene, and vinyl chloride were detected. The associate professor from CMU, Albert Presto, said that acrolein was a cause for continuing research because of potential risk. The presence of acrolein was found in some parts of East Palestine at levels as found in other American cities such as Pittsburgh. Acrolein was not listed in the chemicals that Norfolk Southern indicated were transported in the railcars; however, it can be produced by the combustion of fuel, wood and plastics.

The measuring technique by the CMU and Texas A&M researchers is by mobile lab in a van that draws in air above the van driver's head as it travels at low speed. The van is part of CMU's Center for Atmospheric Particle Studies. The van made measurements every ten feet as it drove through East Palestine. The testing unit can measure particles ever second and can identify miniscule concentrations in parts per billion.

A Purdue University team collaborated with residents and a community group formed after the disaster called United for East Palestine. The Purdue University team was onsite from February 25 to 27, 2023 meeting with residents, as well as collecting creek and home drinking water samples. After visiting the site, the researchers called for warnings to be issued to the public about the acute risk posed by the heavily contaminated creeks. On March 1, USEPA Administrator Michael Regan publicly advised residents to stay away from the creeks. Also found by the team was that some private drinking water well owners had called the Columbiana Health Department multiple days multiple times to have their well tested, but the Health Department hadn't called them back. Results of the Purdue University studies will be released on their website.

Lawsuits and compensation 
On February 8, affected businesses and residents filed three class action lawsuits against Norfolk Southern Railway. One demands the company to pay for the medical screenings and treatments of people living within a  radius of the derailment. Norfolk Southern Railway offered  payments to locals to "cover costs related to the evacuation". Some residents expressed concerns that taking these payouts would limit their ability to join future legal actions.

On February 14, the company pledged a  "community support fund", and free chemical testing of air, water, and soil.

On February 21, the EPA ordered Norfolk Southern to find and clean contaminated water and soil, and to pay for the EPA's own cleaning efforts.

On March 6, Pennsylvania Governor Josh Shapiro announced that Norfolk Southern pledged $5 million to reimburse the fire departments for damaged equipment and another $1 million for damages to the people or businesses of Beaver and Lawrence Counties in Pennsylvania. Another $1.4 million was promised by the company, totaling an additional $7.4 million to what was initially pledged by the company, to state agencies that responded to the incident.

The following week, Ohio Attorney General Dave Yost filed a 58-count civil lawsuit against Norfolk Southern.

Reactions 

Commentary following the derailment centered around industry working conditions and safety concerns, such as the lack of modern brake safety regulations, the implementation of precision scheduled railroading (PSR), reduced railway workers per train, and increased train lengths and weight. Critics said that train companies have failed to invest in train maintenance to prevent accidents, even though they conduct stock buybacks, in which capital that could be used on maintenance and safety measures is instead distributed to existing shareholders.

On February 14, Governor Mike DeWine told reporters that he was not seeing any problems in the area after the controlled release of chemicals and that President Joe Biden had offered federal assistance but DeWine said that no further assistance was necessary.

A town hall meeting was held on February 15 between residents and local, state, and federal officials. Norfolk Southern representatives declined to attend due to a perceived physical threat. Some residents expressed distrust in the company and government.

On February 16, DeWine released a statement saying after speaking with the White House, he requested more aid from the U.S. Department of Health and Human Services (HHS), the Health and Emergency Response Team (HERT), and the Centers for Disease Control and Prevention (CDC). DeWine also said his office had been informed by the Federal Emergency Management Agency (FEMA) that it was not eligible for FEMA assistance. He said during a press conference on February 17 "although FEMA is synonymous with disaster support, they're most typically involved with disasters where there is tremendous home or property damage", such as tornadoes, flooding, or hurricanes. Biden's spokesperson said FEMA was supporting the other agencies which were better matched to this type of disaster.

On February 16 Sherrod Brown, senior senator of Ohio, visited East Palestine, met with EPA Head Regan and met with residents and first responders. He sent a letter to Governor DeWine, asking him to declare a state of emergency and to seek full federal support in cleanup efforts. He also sent letters to the NTSB and the EPA, calling on them to investigate the accident and to provide assistance in the area.  On the following Sunday, February 19, when interviewed, Brown said that residents were "right to be skeptical." He said that Norfolk Southern should go beyond giving a $1,000 payment to every resident in the city. Brown said that the company should abide by its pledge to "make everybody whole."

Health teams from the CDC and HHS were expected to arrive as early as February 20.

Former President Donald Trump visited East Palestine on February 22, giving a speech a half a mile away from the wreckage in which he criticized the federal response to the disaster and offered relief. Trump provided thousands of bottles of "Trump Spring Water" for the community, walked through East Palestine, flanked by his son Donald Trump Jr. and Ohio Senator J. D. Vance and then visited a local McDonald's to purchase food for the first responders.

On the evening of February 22, Governor DeWine, EPA Administrator Regan and Norfolk Southern CEO Alan Shaw appeared at a CNN town hall in East Palestine, and Shaw apologized to the community's residents. "I'm terribly sorry for what has happened to your community." He added, "I want you to know that Norfolk Southern is here, and we're going to stay here. And we're going to make this right."

On February 27, Senator Brown made a return trip to East Palestine, held a town hall and met with residents and business owners. In a press briefing afterwards he promoted additional regulations for railcars to ensure that this sort of accident would not recur. He added, "I want to see rail safety legislation passed in the next few weeks."

In the aftermath of the disaster, Norfolk Southern was accused of prioritizing $10 billion stock buybacks for shareholders instead of maintenance. Shaw was accused of sidestepping questions about Norfolk Southern's support for then president Trump's 2017 overturning of the Obama administration requirement for ECP brakes and Norfolk Southern's pressing the federal government against a rule that in most cases would require more than one person operating a freight train.

Several unions and consumer organizations have expressed concern with regard to private ownership of railways and a "profit-driven approach", which they claim puts workers and communities at high risk. The United Electrical, Radio and Machine Workers of America (UE) also called for public ownership of the US railway systems.

The Biden administration and U.S. Secretary of Transportation Pete Buttigieg have received criticism over their response to the derailment, with some lawmakers and locals of East Palestine describing the response as delayed and lackluster despite Mike DeWine refusing aid. East Palestine's mayor criticized Biden's visit to Ukraine amid the derailment crisis. Buttigieg received backlash from right-wing and Republican lawmakers, as well as from some on the political left. The Biden administration defended their response to the derailment saying they had "mobilized a robust, multi-agency effort to support the people of East Palestine, Ohio" that was refused by Mike DeWine.

The House Republicans are set to launch a probe into the incident as well as the "too late response", as they accused the Transportation Department of neglect.

Within hours of the derailment, Erin Brockovich started getting calls for assistance from the community about the toxic chemical fires. She has been interviewed on various news outlets, from independent media to national networks. A few weeks later, Brockovich traveled to East Palestine, Ohio where she was interviewed by local media, and appeared at one of several high-profile town hall meetings on Friday night, Feb. 24th. At the meeting, Brockovich and an attorney highlighted decades of toxic chemical train derailments. Among Brockovich's many concerns is the potential groundwater contamination after chemicals were, as she describes it, "dumped in a big hole in the ground and burned off." A recurring theme from her appearances is that the nation has, for decades, in the name of profits over people, continued to put off necessary infrastructure improvements, tighter regulations and better response to protect the health, safety and welfare of communities from long-term bodily harm and environmental damage. Brockovich continues to cite the Hinkley case and Flint water crisis, as well as the 2013 Lac-Megantic, Canada oil train catastrophe. On February 24, prior to Brockovich's first town hall in East Palestine, federal and state law enforcement issued a report claiming that her insistence on "placing blame solely on Norfolk Southern" could result in "increased tensions in the community" and possibly even the emergence of "special interest terrorism."

Giant Eagle temporarily suspended the sale and product distribution of Salineville, Ohio sourced spring water. Spokesperson Dan Donovan, said, "[the company is] operating out of an abundance of caution," also mentioning, "[their water comes from] a protected spring located at a higher elevation than East Palestine and is not near groundwater sources directly impacted by the incident," adding that, "A third-party lab has been testing Salineville’s raw water sources and finished products and “has not found any evidence” that the water was negatively impacted by the derailment."

On March 5, 2023 a local music group, The Conkle Brothers, partnered with the Brightside Project (a non-profit in Salem, Ohio), to put on a local music benefit for the residents of East Palestine featuring 20 local musicians and raising over $7,000 dollars.

Brakes 

Electronically controlled pneumatic (ECP) brakes may potentially reduce stopping distances by up to 60 percent over conventional railway air brakes. The derailed train was not equipped with ECP brakes, which former Federal Railroad Administration official Steven Ditmeyer said would have mitigated the severity of the accident. The Obama administration proposed safety regulations for trains carrying hazardous materials in 2014; these were weakened by lobbying from the railway industry. In 2017, further lobbying persuaded the Trump administration to begin a repeal of the regulations requiring the use of such brakes on trains.

The U.S. Department of Transportation's Pipeline and Hazardous Materials Safety Administration (PHMSA) said the FAST Act, enacted by the Republican-controlled 114th United States Congress and signed by President Barack Obama, instead required them to repeal ECP brake mandates, after a regulatory impact analysis report stated in 2018 that "the expected costs of ECP brakes are significantly higher than the expected benefit". The Trump administration finalized a roll back of the requirement for electronically controlled brakes in September 2018. The National Transportation Safety Board (NTSB) has recommended this technology for all trains. As of 2023, the Biden administration had not reinstated this rule, and transportation secretary Pete Buttigieg made a tweet claiming that this technology may have prevented the derailment.

NTSB chair Jennifer Homendy explained that the train in this accident would not have been required to utilize the ECP braking system even if the FAST Act was not repealed, because the term "high-hazard flammable train" means a single train transporting 20 or more tank cars loaded with a Class 3 flammable liquid. As it had only three such placarded train cars, the derailed train did not meet the qualifications of a "high-hazard flammable" train.

Misinformation 
The derailment sparked the spread and circulation of misinformation, fake news, and conspiracy theories. Most were heavy exaggerations of the derailment and the events surrounding it.

Some commentators alleged that concurrently-reported high-altitude object events were being overemphasized or even faked as a red herring to distract the public from the derailment or cover it up entirely. Conspiracy theorists, such as congresswoman Marjorie Taylor Greene and football player Aaron Rodgers, claimed the U.S. government had faked the high-altitude objects to distract from the derailment, allegations of American responsibility for the Nord Stream pipeline sabotage, and the release of Jeffrey Epstein's client list. Chinese Ministry of Foreign Affairs spokeswoman Hua Chunying and South China Morning Post columnist Alex Lo suggested Western media organizations were deliberately overemphasizing high-altitude object stories over the derailment. However, the derailment received constant coverage from news outlets since the initial derailment, though Media Matters for America noted most television news coverage did not cover it in depth and presented it merely "as an accident", with little mention of railway industry lobbying or safety regulation concerns.

A Wired editorial noted that while social media attention increased coverage on traditional media outlets, it also created a "perfect storm" for alarmist posts and conspiracy theories.

Allegations that police were arresting journalists attempting to report on the incident were also false. Only one journalist was arrested—NewsNation reporter Evan Lambert on February 8 for disorderly conduct and trespassing—but this was recorded live in a room full of witnesses and other journalists (making any attempt at a cover-up impractical), and charges against Lambert were dismissed on February 15, with him freely continuing to report on the derailment after his release. The U.S. Press Freedom Tracker and the Committee to Protect Journalists have reported no further arrests since Lambert's, nor have they been aware of any press restrictions.

Criticizing the spread of misinformation in regard to the derailment, NTSB Chair Jennifer Homendy urged the public to let the NTSB investigate and stop "adding pain to a community that's been through enough", adding that if people genuinely wanted to help, the NTSB was hiring.

Comparisons
Several news reports have drawn parallels between this derailment and the 2012 Paulsboro train derailment, which also involved release of vinyl chloride.

Similarities between the derailment and the plot of the 2022 film White Noise have been noted. The film features a cataclysmic train accident that creates a plume of toxic chemical waste over an Ohio town. It was adapted from the 1985 novel of the same name by Don DeLillo. The central character, Jack Gladney, teaches at an Ohio college. The film was shot in Salem, Ohio (20 miles away), Cleveland, on the campuses of Akron University and Kent State University, and elsewhere around the state.

Second Ohio derailment
On March 4, 2023, another Norfolk Southern train derailed near Springfield, Ohio. The train was not transporting any hazardous chemicals, according to Norfolk Southern. In a statement on Sunday, March 5, 2023, the company reported that 28 cars of the 212-car train derailed, after initially reporting that 20 had derailed. The company also reported that the train's two-person crew was unharmed. Ohio senator Sherrod Brown referred to the two derailments as "unacceptable". No cause for the crash has been determined.

See also

 List of American railroad accidents
 List of rail accidents (2020–present)
 2022 United States railroad labor dispute
 Concrete ties
 Farragut derailment (2002), another Norfolk Southern derailment which caused release of hazardous chemicals
 Graniteville train crash (2005), two Norfolk Southern freight trains collided, releasing toxic chlorine gas which killed 10 and injured 250 others
 Hazardous Materials Transportation Act
 Lac-Mégantic rail disaster (2013), a MMA Railway freight train carrying crude oil derailed, resulting in an explosion which killed 47
 Miamisburg train derailment (1986), a Baltimore and Ohio Railroad freight train derailment resulting in release of hazardous chemicals and the largest mass evacuation in Ohio history
 Mississauga train derailment (1979), a CP Rail freight train derailed, releasing hazardous chemicals
 Nemadji River train derailment (1992), a Burlington Northern freight train derailed, releasing nearly 22,000 gallons of liquid benzene into the Nemadji River and toxic emissions into the air, resulting in the largest evacuation in U.S. history from a train accident
 Weyauwega, Wisconsin, derailment (1996), a Wisconsin Central Ltd. freight train derailed, releasing hazardous chemicals

References

Further reading

External links

 East Palestine, Ohio Train Derailment Emergency Response | Environmental Protection Agency
 Accident Investigation Page | NTSB
 Making it Right in East Palestine | Norfolk Southern Railway 
 Governor Mike DeWine and Ohio state officials. Press conference about the hazardous train derailment in East Palestine, February 14, 2023 - YouTube

2023 disasters in the United States
Train derailment
Ohio train derailment
Accidents and incidents involving Norfolk Southern Railway
Articles containing video clips
Chemical disasters
Columbiana County, Ohio
Derailments in the United States
Environmental disasters in the United States
Ohio train derailment
2023 train derailment
Ohio train derailment